Mount Musharraf is  a mountain of the Sarwat Mountains range in Saudi Arabia, and at 2,859m in height one of the highest mountains of Saudi Arabia. It is located in the Asir region at 17°54′40″N and 43°18′20″E near the town of Al-Harjah.

References

Moushref